Eric Moe (born March 6, 1988, in Timrå, Sweden) is a defenceman playing for Leksands IF hockey team in the Swedish second league, HockeyAllsvenskan.

Career statistics

International play
Played for Sweden in:

2006 World U18 Championships
2008 World Junior Championships (silver medal)

International statistics

External links

References 

 
 

1988 births
Leksands IF players
Living people
Swedish ice hockey defencemen